The Social War (from Latin , properly 'war of the allies'), also called the Italian War  or the Marsic War, was fought from 91 to 87 BC between the Roman Republic and several of its autonomous allies in Italy. The Italian allies wanted Roman citizenship, not only for the status and influence that came with it, but also for the right to vote in Roman elections and laws. They believed that they should be treated equally to the Romans, given that they had formed cultural and linguistic connections with the Roman civilization, and had been their loyal allies for over two centuries. The Romans strongly opposed their demands, and refused to grant them citizenship, thus leaving the socii with fewer rights and privileges.

The situation escalated in 91 BC, leading to the outbreak of a devastating war, in which many of the Italian allies, headed by the Samnites and the Marsi, staged a four-year revolt against Roman rule. Most of the Etruscan, Umbrian and Latin allies did not join the rebellion. In order to end the conflict, and to avoid future conflict of the same kind, the Romans decreed several laws by which the peoples and cities who remained loyal or surrendered to Rome would be awarded Roman citizenship. By 87 BC, Roman victory was complete, and citizenship had been extended to all of peninsular Italy.

The Social War led to a complete Romanization of Italy. The Etruscans and the Italic peoples quickly integrated themselves into the Roman world after gaining Roman citizenship. Their own languages and cultures became extinct in the process, and the term "Roman" came to refer to all inhabitants of Italy. The Romans did not consider Sicily, Sardinia and Corsica part of Italy during this period. Cisalpine Gaul was also not legally considered Italian territory until 42 BC, when it had been merged into Roman Italy, as indicated in Caesar's unpublished acts (Acta Caesaris).

Origins
Roman victory in the Samnite Wars (343–290 BC) resulted in effective Roman dominance of the Italian peninsula. This dominance was expressed in a collection of alliances between Rome and the cities and communities of Italy, on more or less favorable terms depending on whether a given city had voluntarily allied with Rome or been defeated in war. These cities were theoretically independent, but in practice Rome had the right to demand from them tribute money and a certain number of soldiers: by the 2nd century BC the Italian allies contributed between one half and two-thirds of the soldiers in Roman armies. Rome also had virtual control over the allies' foreign policy, including their interaction with one another. Aside from the Second Punic War, where Hannibal had limited success in turning some Italian communities against Rome, for the most part the Italian communities were content to remain as client states of Rome in return for local autonomy.

The Romans' policy of land distribution had led to great inequality of land-ownership and wealth. This led to the "Italic people declining little by little into pauperism and paucity of numbers without any hope of remedy" (Appian).

A number of political proposals had attempted to address the growing discrepancy whereby Italians made a significant contribution to Rome's military force, while receiving disproportionately small shares of land and citizenship rights. These efforts came to a head under the impetus of Marcus Livius Drusus in 91 BC. His reforms would have granted the Italian allies Roman citizenship, giving them a greater say in the external policy of the Roman Republic.  Most local affairs came under local governance and were not as important to the Romans as, for example, when the alliance would go to war or how they would divide the plunder. The response of the Roman senatorial elite to Drusus' proposals was to reject his ideas and assassinate him. This brusque dismissal of the granting of rights that the Italians considered to be long overdue greatly angered them, and communities throughout Italy attempted to declare independence from Rome in response, sparking a war.

War

The Social War began in 91 BC when the Italian allies revolted. The Latins as a whole remained largely loyal to Rome, with the one exception of Venusia. The Etruscans and Umbrians, who were the most powerful people amongst Socii, mostly stayed neutral at the beginning. They were soon offered citizenship by Rome to prevent them from joining the rebellion.  The rebellious allies not only planned a formal separation from Rome, but also the re-organisation of Italia (the Roman term for the peninsula) as its own independent federation, with its own capital at Corfinium (in modern Abruzzo) that was renamed Italica. To pay for the troops, they created their own coinage that was used as propaganda against Rome. The coins depict eight warriors taking an oath, probably representing the Marsi, Picentines, Paeligni, Marrucini, Vestini, Frentani, Samnites and Hirpini.

The Italian soldiers were battle-hardened, most of them having served in the Roman armies.  The allies of Italia were originally able to field 120,000 men. The Italians divided this force according to their positions within Italy.
 Quintus Poppaedius Silo had overall command of the "Marsic Group", as consul.
 Gaius Papius Mutilus had overall command of the "Samnite Group", as consul.
 Titus Lafrenius commanded the Marsi in 90 BC, when he was killed in action. He was succeeded by Fraucus.
 Titus Vettius Scato commanded the Paeligni to 88 BC, when he was captured by the Romans and killed by his slave.
 Gaius Pontidius probably commanded the Vestini, probably at least until 89 BC.
 Herius Asinius commanded the Marrucini until 89 BC, when he was killed in action. He was succeeded by Obsidius who was also killed in action.
 Gaius Vidacilius commanded the Picentes until 89 BC, when he committed suicide.
 Publius Praesentius probably commanded the Frentani, probably throughout the war.
 Numerius Lucilius probably commanded the Hirpini until 89 BC, when he seems to have been succeeded by Minatus Iegius (or Minius Iegius).
 Lucius Cluentius commanded the Pompeiani in 89 BC when he was killed in action by Lucius Cornelius Sulla.
 Titus Herennius probably commanded the Venusini throughout the war.
 Trebatius may have commanded the Iapygii throughout the war.
 Marcus Lamponius commanded the Lucani throughout the war.
 Marius Egnatius commanded the Samnites until 88 BC when he was killed in action. He was succeeded by Pontius Telesinus who was also killed in action that year.

The Roman strategy focused on surviving the first onslaught, while simultaneously trying to entice other Italian clients to remain loyal or refrain from defection, and then meet the threat of the revolt with troops raised from provinces as well as from client kingdoms.  One of the two separate theatres of war was assigned to each of the consuls of 90 BC. In the north, the consul Publius Rutilius Lupus was advised by Gaius Marius and Pompeius Strabo; in the south the consul Lucius Julius Caesar had Lucius Cornelius Sulla and Titus Didius.

Events in 91 BC
 Marcus Livius Drusus, a champion of the Italian cause, was assassinated by an unknown assailant. Drusus's death meant the end of his enfranchisement policy.
 When news of Drusus's assassination reached the Marsi, they decided on a show of force.  Quintus Poppaedius Silo, a leader of the Marsi and a good friend of Drusus, led a march on Rome. They were met by Gnaeus Domitius Ahenobarbus, the Pontifex Maximus, who persuaded them to go back. When Ahenobarbus returned to Rome he informed the Senate something had to be done quickly or there would be war.
 By mid-autumn, the peace had irrevocably broken down. Diplomacy and negotiations had failed; the Social War started.
 The first to rebel and take up arms were the Marsi. They were joined by the Vestini (a Sabine tribe), the Peligni (an Apennine mountain tribe) and the Marruncini.
 The second major group of Italians to rebel were the Samnites. They were quickly joined by more Italian tribes including the Hirpini, the Lucanians, Apulia and the Frentani.
 The Italian rebels chose two consuls to take command of the war. Quintus Poppaedius Silo commanded the 'northern' group, while Gaius Papius Mutilus commanded the 'southern' group.
 The Roman colonies of Alba Fucensis and Aesernia, which were in Italian territory, came under siege.
 When the rebels took Asculum, the first city to fall to them, they slaughtered every Roman they could find. The wives of the men who refused to join them were tortured and scalped.
 While marching his legions south through Picenum, Gnaeus Pompeius Strabo, who had recruited troops (3–4 legions) on Rome's behalf in his native Picenum, was suddenly attacked by a large force of Picentes, Vestini and Marsi led by the rebel general Scato. Although the battle favoured neither side, Pompeius Strabo was heavily outnumbered and he decided to withdraw. Eventually he found himself blockaded in Picenum.
 The Romans elected Lucius Julius Caesar and Publius Rutilius Lupus as consuls for the following year. Caesar was to command the southern front against the Samnites and their allies while Lupus was to command the northern front against the Marsi and their allies. Caesar was allocated Lucius Cornelius Sulla as senior legate (second-in-command) while Lupus was allocated Gaius Marius. Marius and Sulla were considered Rome's best military commanders.

Events in 90 BC
 In central Italy, Gaius Perpenna, a legate of consul Rutilius Lupus, was defeated by the Italian general Presentius. The Romans lost 4,000 men. The remnant of Perpenna's force was transferred to the army of Marius.
 In Lucania, Licinus Crassus, a legate of Lucius Caesar, lost 800 men when the Lucanians under Marcus Lamponius set fire to his camp.
 Sextus Caesar attempted to head off Italian reinforcements marching towards the siege of Aesernia, but was beaten back with the loss of 2,000 men.
 Aesernia was taken by the Italians.
 Mutilus and the Samnite army invaded Campania and took the city of Nola (by betrayal). Afterwards, he starved his Roman prisoners (including the praetor Lucius Postumus) to death.
 Mutilus attacked Lucius Caesar's camp, but Caesar fought off the assault and killed 6,000 rebels. This was the first substantial defeat of the Italian rebels. The news of the victory caused the Senate to decree that the population should resume wearing togas again (they had stopped doing so as a sign their country was struggling at war).
 On 11 June the consul Rutilius was ambushed by the Marsi led by Vettius Scato while crossing the River Tolenus. The rebels killed 8,000 of Rutilius's men, including the consul himself.
 Gaius Marius and his division were operating separately from Rutilis and crossed the river downstream of the battle, captured the Marsi camp, and then attacked the Marsi, routing them with heavy losses.
 Quintus Servilius Caepio defeated the Paeligni, a rebel tribe related to the Marruncini.
 The Senate then decided to give joint command to Marius and Caepio. Marius had expected sole command and he did not get along with Caepio with disastrous results. After having dealt with a raiding party of Marsi at Varnia, Caepio attempted to give Marius instructions, but Marius ignored them. Caepio left on his own was then obliged to move his legions back towards Caeoli. Once they reached the Anio at Sublaqueum they were attacked by the Marsi. Caepio's column was massacred. It is said he was killed by Quintus Poppaedius Silo himself.
 The Marsi and Marruncini were defeated in battle by Marius working in tandem with Sulla, his old subordinate from the Jugurthine and Cimbrian wars. The Italians lost 6,000 men and the Marruncini general Herius Asinus.
 In the Volturnus valley (at the Melfa Gorge) the Samnites under Marius Egnatius ambushed Lucius Caesar who still managed to fight his way through to Teanum where he took up a defensive position. Lucius Caesar lost 8,000 of his 30,000 infantry in the ambush.
 Pompeius Strabo succeeded in breaking out of Picenum and drove the rebels all the way back to Asculum. He then started to besiege the city.
 The consul Lucius Caesar returned to Rome and pushed through the Lex Julia de civitate Latinis et sociis danda which gave Roman citizenship to any Italian with Latin rights, and made eligible for citizenship any Italian who had not taken up  arms against the Romans. This marked the turning point of the war. Many Italians flocked to the Roman standards, depriving the rebels of manpower.
 Pompeius Strabo, who by now had been elected one of the consuls for the next year, attacked and defeated a rebel column trying to march into Etruria, killing 5,000 rebels. Another 5,000 died while trying to get back across the Apennines.

Events in 89 BC
 Lucius Porcius Cato, who had been elected junior consul for 89 BC, took over the southern command from Lucius Caesar.
 Vidacilius, the leader of the rebels in southern Picenum, and his men (c. 4,000) managed to fight their way through the siege lines and reinforced Asculum. However, upon seeing the hopelessness of their cause he and his followers committed suicide.
 Sextus Caesar, now a lieutenant of the Senior Consul Pompeius Strabo, caught the rebels shifting camp outside Asculum and fell upon them, killing 8,000 and scattering the rest.
 The consul Cato engaged the Marsi in battle near Fucine Lake (close to Alba Fucensis). He died in an attempt to storm the enemy camp. Sulla then took command of the southern front.
 In a huge battle near Asculum, Pompeius Strabo defeated an Italian relief army of 60,000 men. The city capitulated soon after.
 In the south Sulla, moved on the offensive. He started to besiege Pompeii and Herculaneum. When the rebel general Cleuntius tried to reinforce the city, Sulla routed the rebel army, chased them to Nola, and there massacred 20,000 rebels in battle right in front of the walls.
 After his victory at Nola, Sulla turned on the Hirpini to the north. He quickly forced them to surrender. He then marched on Samnium.
 Sulla invaded Samnium by a circuitous route and thereby surprised and defeated Mutilus (the Samnite commander), attacking him from an unsuspected direction. With the Samnite army routed he marched on Bovianum, the Samnite capital, and stormed it in a three-hour assault.
 The praetor Gaius Cosconius attacked the rebel general Trebatius and a Samnite army while it was crossing the Aufidus near Cannae, killing 15,000 rebels.
 Quintus Caecilius Metellus Pius captured Venusia, along with 3,000 rebel soldiers.
 After Sulla had returned to his sieges in Campania, Poppaedius Silo recaptured Bovianum. Silo then tried to eject Metellus from Apulia, but failed and died in the attempt.
 Herculaneum, Pompeii and several rebel cities in Campania surrendered to Sulla. Only Nola and Aesernia remained defiant.

By the end of 89 BC most of the rebel leaders were dead. In the north the last pockets of resistance were being mopped up by Pompeius Strabo and in the south only the Samnites remained a threat.

Aftermath in 88–87 BC: another war
At the beginning of 88 BC, the war was largely over except for the Samnites, the old rivals of Rome, who still held out. It is likely that the war would have continued for some time had Rome not made concessions to their allies. Rome could now return their focus on the rest of their republic. In the East a new threat loomed; Mithridates, the king of Pontus, invaded the Roman province of Asia and slaughtered Romans and Italians alike. Rome's generals contended for the honour (and profit) of commanding the war against the eastern king. This led to Sulla's march on Rome. The Samnites would become major players in the civil strife that followed.

The Samnites and Lucanians held out at Nola and Bruttium until 87 BC, when the conflict subsumed into the Roman civil war that broke out that year.

Roman concessions to the Allies
Lucius Julius Caesar sponsored the Lex Julia during his consulship, which he carried out before his office ended. The law offered full citizenship to all Latin and Italian communities who had not revolted. This was mainly done to prevent the Etruscans and Umbrians from joining the rebellion.

However, the law offered the option of citizenship to whole communities and not to individuals. This meant that each individual community had to pass the law, most likely by a vote in assembly, before it could take effect. It was also possible under the Lex Julia for citizenship to be granted as a reward for distinguished military service in the field.

It is assumed that the Lex Julia was closely followed by a supplementary statute, the Lex Plautia Papiria, which stated that a registered male of an allied Italian state could obtain Roman citizenship by presenting himself to a Roman praetor within 60 days of the passing of the law. This law granted Roman citizenship to fellow Italians who had rebelled against Rome.

See also
 Coinage of the Social War

Citations

References
 
 
Alberto Campana, La Monetazione degli insorti italici durante la Guerra Sociale (91-87 a.C.), Soliera, Edizioni Apparuti, 1987.
 
 
 
 
 

90s BC conflicts
80s BC conflicts
1st century BC in the Roman Republic
Roman Republican civil wars